Taylon Bieldt (born 4 November 1998) is a South African athlete specialising in the 100 metres hurdles and 400 metres hurdles. She has won several medals at continental level.

International competitions

Personal bests
Outdoor
200 metres – 23.42 (-0.2 m/s, Sasolburg 2022)
400 metres – 52.81 (Pretoria 2020)
100 metres hurdles – 13.10 (-1.2m/s, Madrid 2022)
400 metres hurdles – 55.80 (Potchefstroom 2022)

References

1998 births
Living people
South African female hurdlers
Athletes (track and field) at the 2019 African Games
White South African people
African Games competitors for South Africa